Fantasia Sango is a role-playing video game series developed and published by UserJoy Technology. A total of six video games have been released since 2003, with the latest installment, Fantasia Sango 5, available in 2018. An anime television series by Geek Toys aired from January to March 2022.

Synopsis

Setting
The game is set in the Three Kingdoms era, when various warlords and their armies attempt to conquer and unify the nation, as well as combining the Romance of the Three Kingdoms, one of the Four Great Classical Novels.

Plot
The Three Kingdoms era in China was full of strife and war. Warlords and their armies were at each other's throats in attempts to conquer and unify the nation under their sole control. The Wangliang King, the monstrous sovereign of evil spirits, can't help but notice the conflict. What he aims is to prolong the conflict and ultimately destroy humanity.

To fight against the evil Wangliang King and his cronies, an organization called Tianyuan forms anti-Wangliang armies. They are on missions to stop the Wangliang King. However, when the sixth anti-Wangliang Corps members are all killed, a new Corps is created from a band of adventurers who can be best described as hooligans.

Characters

Development and release

Fantasia Sango is a video game series developed and published by Taiwanese video game developer UserJoy Technology. The series was introduced in 2003 following the release of the first installment of the franchise, when the sixth game, titled Fantasia Sango 5, released on August 15, 2018.

Anime adaptation
An anime television series, titled Fantasia Sango - Realm of Legends, was announced on July 30, 2021. The series is animated by Geek Toys and directed by Shunsuke Machitani, with Shinpei Nagai serving as assistant director, Masashi Suzuki in charge of series scripts, CSPG and Tetsutarō Yui designing the characters, and Tsutomu Tagashira composing the series' music. It was set to premiere in October 2021, but was delayed due to "various circumstances."  The series aired from January 11 to March 29, 2022 on BS12.  Machico performed the opening theme song "Enishi".

Internationally, the series is licensed by Funimation outside of Asia. While Medialink licensed for Hong Kong and Taiwan only.

Reception
The franchise has sold over two million copies as of the fifth iteration.

References

External links
  
 

2022 anime television series debuts
Anime television series based on video games
Crunchyroll anime
Fantasy anime and manga
Geek Toys
Medialink
Role-playing video games
Supernatural anime and manga
Video games based on Romance of the Three Kingdoms
Video games developed in Taiwan
Video game franchises introduced in 2003
Windows games
Windows-only games
UserJoy Technology games